Route 8, also known as the Birmingham Inner Circle, is a roughly circular bus route in Birmingham, England. It follows the city's middle ring road with some small deviations on parts of the route. The service dates back to the days of Birmingham City Transport.

Present
Like the Outer Circle service 11, buses on the 8 travel both anti-clockwise (8A) and clockwise (8C). The service is operated by National Express West Midlands with Scania OmniLink single deck buses, and was formerly operated by Mercedes-Benz O405N buses, several of which were branded for the Inner Circle. 

In 2004, the Birmingham Repertory Theatre staged the musical "Ridin' The Number 8" by Laurie Hornsby and Euan Rose, in which a cast of 'Brummie' characters board an Inner Circle bus and reminisce about the people and places they encounter along the route.

In October 2020, the 8 transferred to Perry Barr garage upon the closure of Bordesley; where the routes had been operated since 2005.

Route
(Anti-clockwise from Saltley Gate, Alum Rock. Opposite direction for clockwise)

 Saltley Gate/ Alum Rock interchange
 Nechells
 Newtown interchange (A34)
 Hockley interchange
 Jewellery Quarter
 Five Ways interchange (Broad Street, Birmingham)
 Lee Bank
 Highgate
 Sparkbrook interchange
 Small Heath interchange
 Bordesley interchange
 Saltley Gate/ Alum Rock interchange

References

Further reading
M.Hanson, D. Harvey and P. Drake The Inner Circle - Birmingham's No. 8 Bus Route. Tempus 2002.

External links
Travel West Midlands website

8
Circular bus routes
National Express West Midlands bus routes